"Lamplight" is a song by the Bee Gees, released as the B-side of "First of May", but featured as the single's A-side in Germany. It also featured on their double album Odessa in March 1969. The song was written and composed by Barry, Robin & Maurice Gibb and featured lead vocals by Robin Gibb. No other singles were released from the album, and the fact that the group's manager Robert Stigwood chose "First of May", which only featured Barry Gibb's voice for the A-side, that caused Robin to quit the group (he would return in 1970).

Recording
The song's demo was recorded in October 25, 1968 – this and another early version featured on the Sketches for Odessa disc released with the album's remastered edition in 2009.  The song's introduction is sung in French – Alors viens encore cherie J'attendrai ans après ans sous la lampe dans la vieille avenue. The same passage was sung at the song's end, this time in English. There are no French words featured on the demo; it starts straight in at the first stanza.

The song was recorded in Trident and IBC Studios, London, England, produced by Robert Stigwood with the Bee Gees. This song was included on their EP called I Started a Joke, released in the same year.

Personnel
 Robin Gibb – lead and backing vocals, piano, Mellotron
 Maurice Gibb – harmony vocals, bass, piano, acoustic guitar, Mellotron
 Barry Gibb – harmony vocals, acoustic guitar
 Colin Petersen – drums
 Bill Shepherd – orchestral arrangement

Cover versions
Singers Steve Barry and Lorraine Piché covered this song in 2002. Steve Barry produced the recording.

References

1969 singles
Bee Gees songs
Songs written by Barry Gibb
Songs written by Robin Gibb
Songs written by Maurice Gibb
Song recordings produced by Robert Stigwood
Song recordings produced by Barry Gibb
Song recordings produced by Robin Gibb
Song recordings produced by Maurice Gibb
French-language songs
Polydor Records singles
Atco Records singles
Macaronic songs
1968 songs